George Arthur Atkinson (30 September 1909 – 1983) was an English professional footballer who played in the Football League for Hull City, Lincoln City, Mansfield Town and Southport.

References

1909 births
1983 deaths
English footballers
Association football forwards
English Football League players
Goole Town F.C. players
Lincoln City F.C. players
Hull City A.F.C. players
Mansfield Town F.C. players
Southport F.C. players
Thorne Colliery F.C. players